Otto Frederick Roehm (August 2, 1882 – April 29, 1958) was an American wrestler who competed in the 1904 Summer Olympics. Roehm became a U.S. citizen in 1888. At the 1904 Olympic Games, Roehm won a gold medal in lightweight category and also wrestled in the welterweight category, losing to William Beckmann in the semifinals.

References

External links
profile
St Louis Public Library Exhibit

1882 births
1958 deaths
Wrestlers at the 1904 Summer Olympics
American male sport wrestlers
Olympic gold medalists for the United States in wrestling
Canadian male sport wrestlers
Canadian emigrants to the United States
Medalists at the 1904 Summer Olympics
19th-century American people
20th-century American people